Hualin Temple, also known as the Temple of the Five Hundred Genii or Gods, is a Buddhist temple in Guangzhou, China.

History
The Xilai Monastery was established in Panyu (now Guangzhou) by Emperor Wu of the Liang in the AD 520s. It is traditionally credited to the Buddhist missionary monk, Bodhidharma, but he may have arrived in China as early as the Liu Song.

The name was changed to the Hualin Temple by the Zen master Zongfu during his rehabilitation of its grounds in 1655. There used to be a Gilded Ashoka Pagoda and 500 arhats statues but all of them were destroyed during cultural revolution.

See also
 Chinese Buddhism
 List of Buddhist temples
 Guangxiao Temple (Guangzhou)
 Six Banyan Temple, also built in Guangzhou around the same time
 Ocean Banner Temple
 Hualinsi Buddhist Temple station, a metro station nearby

Notes

References

Citations

Bibliography
 .

External links

6th-century establishments in China
6th-century Buddhist temples
Religious organizations established in the 6th century
Buddhist temples in Guangzhou